Willard is an unincorporated community in western Putnam County, Georgia, United States. It lies along State Route 16 between Eatonton and Monticello at an elevation of 554 feet (169 m).

References

Unincorporated communities in Putnam County, Georgia
Unincorporated communities in Georgia (U.S. state)